is a Japanese footballer currently playing as a defender for Iwate Grulla Morioka.

Career statistics

Club
.

Notes

References

External links

1996 births
Living people
Association football people from Osaka Prefecture
Tokai Gakuen University alumni
Japanese footballers
Association football defenders
J2 League players
J3 League players
Kataller Toyama players
Iwate Grulla Morioka players